Romstrade  is a construction company based in Bucharest, Romania which specialises in building construction and civil engineering, infrastructure construction, and facility management. In 2009 Romstrade was the largest construction company in Romania with a revenue of €268 million.

Almost all of Romstrade's business is conducted in Romania. An international branch of the company was started in 2009 with the opening of an office in one of the largest cities in Iraq, Arbil the capital of Iraqi Kurdistan. The company is a member of the Romstrade Group which also includes the charter airline Direct Aero Services and the low-cost airline Blue Air, both based in Bucharest.

History
Romstrade was founded by Nelu Iordache in Adunații-Copăceni, a commune in Giurgiu County, Southern Romania, in 1994 . At first the company had 40 employees and was involved mainly in road construction and maintenance. However, it diversified with time to include building construction, airport maintenance, and civil engineering.

Projects
Important projects for the company include construction and rehabilitation on several important Romanian roads like DN7, DN1, DN1A, DN73, DN65, DN21, DN2, DN66, DN67C, and DN7A, as well as roads in Bucharest, Voluntari, Ploieşti, Timișoara, Deva and Giurgiu. The company is also involved in the construction of a  section of highway in the Iraqi Kurdistan.

Romstrade is also involved in airport construction and maintenance. In March 2010 the company indirectly leased the Bacău International Airport for a period of 34 years through another company in the group. Also in February 2010 the company expressed an intention of building a new airport in the Adunaţii-Copăceni commune on a  plot of land, the entire project being worth €150-200 million.

References

External links
Official website 

Construction and civil engineering companies of Romania
Privately held companies of Romania
Romanian companies established in 1994
Construction and civil engineering companies established in 1994